Umar Khayam Hameed (born 24 February 1989) is a  British Pakistani track and field sprinter and sports entrepreneur. He represented Pakistan in  2016 South Asian Games He is founder of AIS Athletics who organised Dubai Run marathon in association with Dubai Sports Council which was largest marathon event during Expo 2020 in Dubai, United Arab Emirates.

Early life
Hameed was born in Halifax, West Yorkshire to a Pakistani family. He is raised in Leeds. He attended Leeds Metropolitan University while studying he was awarded with sports scholarship later he completed his MSc in International Business from University of Leeds. He formed AIS Athletics UK in 2012 which has become one of the leading sports training brand in Europe and Middle East.

Career
In 2008 he started his career in athletics from  U20-European Athletics Championships  represented England in 200 meters and won Silver Medal. In 2010 he participated in  British Athletics Championships won Gold Medal in 4 x 100 meter relay and also won Bronze Medal in 200 meters. He participated in 2022 World Athletics Indoor Championships however later disqualified due to fitness issues.

International competitions

Personal Bests

Outdoor

   30 MAY 2015 – 4 x 100 Metres Relay – 40.52 – Mersin (TUR)
   19 JUN 2018 – 100 Metres – 10.74 – 965  – Stretford (GBR)

Indoor

 14 MAR 2010 – 200 Metres – 21.95 – Sheffield (GBR)  – 994
 08 DEC 2012 – 300 Metres – 35.89 – Sheffield (GBR)  –  881
 29 JAN 2014 – 60 Metres  – 6.84  – Sheffield (GBR)  –1022

See also
Men's 4 × 100 metres relay world record progression
Women's 4 × 100 metres relay world record progression
Women's 4 × 100 metres relay world record progression
200 metres

300 metres

References

External links 

  
 

1989 births
Living people
Pakistani male sprinters
British male sprinters
Pakistani male hurdlers    
British male hurdlers